Elatostema is a genus of flowering plants containing approximately 350 known species in the nettle family Urticaceae, native to tropical forest clearings throughout Australasia, Asia and Africa. There may be as many as 1,000 species of this little-known genus, which is susceptible to deforestation and other forms of human exploitation. Some species, for instance the recently discovered E. fengshanense, show unusual adaptations to growing in deep shade in caves. DNA analysis suggests that the three genera Elastostema, Pellionia, and Pilea be grouped together as one.

Elatostema repens and E. pulchra are cultivated as houseplants in temperate regions. E. repens and E. repens var. pulchrum have gained the Royal Horticultural Society’s Award of Garden Merit.

Selected species
 Elatostema backeri
 Elatostema fengshanense
 Elatostema grande  – Lord Howe Island
 Elatostema lineolatum
 Elatostema malipoense
 Elatostema montanum  – Norfolk Island
 Elatostema pleiophlebium
 Elatostema pulchra
 Elatostema repens
 Elatostema reticulatum  – Qld, NSW, Australia
 Elatostema rugosum
 Elatostema stipitatum  – Qld, NSW, Australia
 Elatostema umbellatum

References

 
Urticaceae genera